The Kaure–Kosare or Nawa River languages are a small family spoken along the Nawa River in West Papua, near the northern border with Papua New Guinea. The languages are Kaure and Kosare.

Classification
Kaure and Kosare (Kosadle) are clearly related. There is a history of classifying them with the Kapori–Sause languages. However, Kapori and Sause show no particular connection to the Kaure languages, and may be closer to Kwerba.

Foley (2018) considers a connection with Trans-New Guinea to be promising, but tentatively leaves Kaure-Kosare out as an independent language family pending further evidence.

Proto-language

Phonemes
Usher (2020) reconstructs the consonant inventory as follows:

{| 
| *m || *n ||  ||  ||
|-
| *p || *t ||  || *k ||
|-
| *b || ||  || *g ||
|-
|  || *s ||  ||  || *h
|-
| *w || *ɽ || [*j] ||  || 
|}

Coda consonants are stop *C (or more precisely *P) and nasal *N.

{| 
|*i || || *u
|-
|*e || || *o
|-
|*ɛ || || *ɔ
|-
|*æ || *a || 
|}	

Diphthongs are *ɛi, *ɛu, *ai *au.

Pronouns
Usher (2020) reconstructs the pronouns as:
{| 
! !!sg!!pl
|-
!1
|*no (?), *na- || *wɛN
|-
!2
|*ha-(nɛ) || ?
|-
!3
| ? || ?
|}

Basic vocabulary
Some lexical reconstructions by Usher (2020) are:

{| class="wikitable sortable"
! gloss !! Proto-Nawa River
|-
| hair || *haⁱ
|-
| ear || *hwɔkɽuC
|-
| eye || *hwe̝N
|-
| tusk/tooth || *pakaⁱ
|-
| skin/bark || *ki
|-
| breast || *muN
|-
| louse || *miN
|-
| dog || *se̝
|-
| pig || *pî
|-
| bird || *ho̝C
|-
| tree || *tɛⁱC
|-
| woman || *naⁱ
|-
| sun || *h[æ/a]niC
|-
| moon || *paka
|-
| water || *mi[jɛ]
|-
| fire || *sa(-[n/ɽ]ɛN)
|-
| eat || *naⁱ
|}

Vocabulary comparison
The following basic vocabulary words are from Voorhoeve (1971, 1975) and other sources, as cited in the Trans-New Guinea database:

{| class="wikitable sortable"
! gloss !! Kaure !! Kosare !! Narau
|-
! head
| kasera; pleŋ; pɔklai || potɔ´ || 
|-
! hair
| hai; hat || potɔi || fukura hai
|-
! ear
| goklu; huaglüt || 'kɔro || 
|-
! eye
| gewe; hwai; hwew || ĩsɛrit || 
|-
! nose
| gopo; hapu || moro 'kakò || 
|-
! tooth
| sbeje; səbokai || pɛki || sebekai
|-
! tongue
| sremu; sɾumu || pɛrɛ´ || 
|-
! leg
| due; duɛ ||  || nue
|-
! louse
| mi; mĩ || mi || 
|-
! dog
| se || sé || 
|-
! pig
| pi || pi || kandu
|-
! bird
| hou; hu; ku || o || 
|-
! egg
| hore; te; wale || ho's̪ɛri || 
|-
! blood
| hi; katesa; katsa || ña || 
|-
! bone
| era; laq; loa || 'kákò || 
|-
! skin
| aguli; arohei; axlit ||  || 
|-
! breast
| mu; muq || kó kakò || 
|-
! tree
| te; tei; teija || tĩⁿdi || bimesini
|-
! man
| debla; dido ||  || nepra
|-
! woman
| dae || ḑɩmɔ'kasia || 
|-
! sky
| lɛbü || nubɷ || 
|-
! sun
| hafei; haɾi; harei || ɛnɛ´ⸯ || kaberja
|-
! moon
| gaka; poka || paka || 
|-
! water
| bi; biq; gomesi || biɛ || bi
|-
! fire
| sa; saʔ; sareŋ || sá || sare
|-
! stone
| təsi; tɛsi; tisi || 'naka || 
|-
! road, path
| selu || kɛmɔrɔ´ || 
|-
! name
| bəre; blɛ; nokomne || morɔ || 
|-
! eat
| ganasi; kadi; kandɛ || kɛnɛ´ || kanaisini
|-
! one
| gogotia; kauxjaʔ; kaxotia || kora'ɸɛ || 
|-
! two
| tɾapli; təravərei; trapi || tau || 
|}

See also
Kaure–Kapori languages

References

External links 
Kaure languages database at TransNewGuinea.org
 Timothy Usher, New Guinea World, Proto–Nawa River

 
Languages of Indonesia
Language families
Papuan languages